Edward K. Delaney was a mayor of St. Paul, Minnesota during the years 1948-1952. He is one of the many Irish-American political figures in Minnesota politics.

References

American people of Irish descent
Mayors of Saint Paul, Minnesota
Minnesota Democrats
Year of death missing
Year of birth missing